The Greek Handball Super Cup is the third more important competition in Greek handball. The Super Cup is organised by the Hellenic Handball Federation (Greek: ΟΧΕ). The first Super Cup final took place on 13 September 1999. The most successful clubs in the competition are Ionikos Nea Filadelfeia, who have won the 1999 final, and Olympiacos who have won the 2022 revival edition.

Previous winners
 1999 :  Ionikos Nea Filadelfeia
 2022 :  Olympiacos

Finals

Performances

By club

By city

References

External links

Super Cup Mens
Handball Super Cup